Vooremaa is a newspaper published in Estonia. It's the official newspaper of Jõgeva County.

References

Newspapers published in Estonia
Jõgeva County